The Ebersberg lies on the southern slopes of the Deister ridge in Germany.

Location 
The hill is located southwest of the city of Hanover. On its slopes is the town of Springe.

Ascent 
There are numerous footpaths in the Deister which offer several options for climbing the Ebersberg. The ascent from Springe itself is steep.

Sights 
On the hillside aboveSpringe the Göbelbastei with its permanently lit light commemorates Heinrich Göbel who was born in Springe. From here there is a good view of the town. In good weather, visitors can see as far as the Brocken in the Harz mountains.

At the foot of the hill is the Ebersberg glacial erratic (Findling am Ebersberg),  a recognised natural monument.

Hills of Lower Saxony
Deister